Katie Patterson is an Australian businesswoman and soccer referee. In September 2015, she became the first female to referee an A-League team in a competitive match, when she officiated the 2015 FFA Cup tie between Rockdale City Suns and Melbourne Victory at Jubilee Oval.

References

Australian soccer referees
A-League Women referees
Living people
Year of birth missing (living people)